Aamna Sardar is a Pakistani politician. She comes from Haripur District and belongs to Pakistan Muslim League (N) (PMNL (N)).

She serves as Member of the Provincial Assembly of Khyber Pakhtunkhwa in a seat reserved for a woman. She is a member on the Special Committee on the issue of Business activities in the University Town, Peshawar, Standing Committee No. 25 on Establishment Department, Standing Committee No. 14 on Industries and Technical Education Department, Standing Committee No. 12 on Health Department and Right to Information in the Khyber Pakhtunkhwa Assembly.

Sardar earned the degrees of Bachelor of Arts, Bachelor of Education, and Master of Arts in English.

References

Hindkowan people
Khyber Pakhtunkhwa MPAs 2013–2018
Living people
People from Haripur District
Pakistani Muslims
Pakistan Muslim League (N) politicians
Women members of the Provincial Assembly of Khyber Pakhtunkhwa
Year of birth missing (living people)
21st-century Pakistani women politicians